The Ngalakgan are an indigenous Australian people of the Northern Territory.

Language
Ngalakgan is generally classified as a member of the Gunwinyguan family.

Country
Ngalakgan territory covered an estimated , north of the Roper River as far as Mainoru, and ran from east of the Wilton River to the upper Maiwok and Flying Fox creeks. The Jawoyn lay directly west, the Dalabon to the northwest, the Rembarrnga to their immediate north, the Ngandi and Yukul to their east, while the Alawa lay on their southern flank.

Ethnography
Norman Tindale was the earliest ethnographer to work directly with, and study, the Ngalakgan, in 1922 during his first fieldwork trip.

Alternative names
 Ngalagan, Ngalakan. Ngalarkan
 Nalakan, Nalagen
 Nala-nalagen
 Nullakun, Nullikan, Nullikin
 Ngulkpun

Notes

Citations

Sources

Aboriginal peoples of the Northern Territory